Sumitra Singh (born 3 May 1930) is a politician from the Indian state of Rajasthan. Unanimously elected Speaker of the 12th Rajasthan Legislative Assembly in 2003 when she won the assembly election on a Bharatiya Janata Party (BJP) ticket, she is the first woman to have held that post in Rajasthan. She held this post till January 2009. Singh was elected to the Assembly for nine out of twelve terms (1957, 1962, 1967, 1972, 1977, 1985, 1990, 1998, 2003), six times out of which from the Jhunjhunu constituency.

External links
Ex-Speaker of Rajasthan Legislative Assembly

Rajasthani people
Bharatiya Janata Party politicians from Rajasthan
Women in Rajasthan politics
Speakers of the Rajasthan Legislative Assembly
1930 births
Living people
People from Jhunjhunu district
21st-century Indian women politicians
21st-century Indian politicians